Les Alluets-le-Roi is a commune in the Yvelines department in northern France.

Population

See also
Communes of the Yvelines department

References

Communes of Yvelines